Va Sokthorn is a footballer who is currently playing for Nagaworld FC in the Cambodian League. Born in France, he has represented Cambodia at senior international level.

Personal life
Va Sokthorn was born in Le Creusot in the province of Burgundy to Cambodian parents from Kratié Province and Prey Veng Province. After scoring 17 goals in only 14 appearances for his local side in the 2013-14 season he decided to go to his parents homeland to play in hope of making the national team, despite interest from other French teams. In August 2015 Va Sokthorn became the third French-Cambodian player to sign for Phnom Penh Crown.

International career
Va Sokthorn played 4 times for his parents' homeland in qualification for the 2018 World Cup.

International goals

Honours

Club
Phnom Penh Crown
Cambodian League: 2015

References

1987 births
Living people
Cambodian footballers
Cambodia international footballers
French footballers
Sportspeople from Le Creusot
French people of Cambodian descent
Association football forwards
FC Montceau Bourgogne players
Phnom Penh Crown FC players
Chambéry SF players
Footballers from Bourgogne-Franche-Comté